James Treble is an Australian building and interior designer, host of the TV show Renovate Or Rebuild on Nine Network and a presenter on Open Homes Australia, on 9Life. Treble is publicly known for his six-hours live co-hosting on Your Money until 2019 and as a design expert on Network Ten lifestyle program The Living Room for seven seasons since its very beginning in 2012. An ambassador for Planet Ark since 2015, Treble supports sensible purchasing, recycling and creative re-purposing.

Between 2020-2021 James was awarded the NSW Fellowship from the Design Institute of Australia, for his contribution to the design industry and the continuous support and education of new interior designers.

With decades of experience in the building industry, Treble is a specialised kitchen and bathroom designer, a qualified real estate agent, a colour consultant and has a diploma in interior design. Working as a building designer since 2002, Treble's main activity is helping his clients in planning and designing their new homes.

Treble contributes as homes' design expert to the Bauer monthly lifestyle magazine Inside Out, after writing to each issue of HOMES+ from its launch in 2014 to its closure in 2018 and shares his knowledge also through workshops and seminars to students of Interior Design at TAFE and ISCD (International School of Colour and Design).

Thanks to his extensive travels and visits to international exhibitions James Treble is a sough after speaker on Interior Design and Trends and a popular MC to Building Industry Expos, Fairs and Awards.

Personal life
James Treble was born in Sydney (1969) where he grew up in the suburb of Carlingford. He travels extensively for work, Australia and overseas, and lives in Sydney with his partner and artist Sandro Nocentini and their 2 children.

Radio and television
In 2012, Treble was invited to be the interior design expert on the four time Logies winner TV lifestyle program The Living Room. On the show for seven seasons, since its beginning, Treble entertains the audiences through Design Challenges and Design Quickies.

Since 2016, Treble has appeared monthly on Sky News Real Estate, explaining live how and why interior design affects and increases property value. In 2017, Treble became the co-host of the Australian show Your Money - Auction Day (formerly Sky News Real Estate), hosting live every Saturday until the network closure in May 2019.

In 2016 and 2018, Treble was live on radio with a weekly segment on popular Talking Lifestyle channel. Offering home design and renovation advice, Treble answered live to queries from radio and online listeners.

In 2019, James accepted the role of co-presenter on the lifestyle TV show Open Homes Australia, broadcast on 9Life (free-to-air Ch 94).

In 2021, the brand new lifestyle show Renovate Or Rebuild debuted on TV channel 9Life with celebrity designers launched by the Nine Network TV show The Block, and James Treble as its host.

Design awards
In 2013, Treble designed the Benton Home with Buildcraft Constructions, which achieves two Home Master Builders of Australia Excellence Awards.

In 2016, again with Buildcraft Constructions, the Aurora Home won a Master Builders of Australia Excellence Award as well as the Hills Building and Design Award for Residential Interior Design.

In 2019, Treble's work is finalist in six separate categories at the Housing Industry of Australia Awards and awarded three NSW winning positions with builders Eden Brae Homes (Best Display Home in its category) and Camelot Homes ([Best Spec Homes] and Best Kitchen in its category).

In 2020, the house designed with Camelot Homes is also won the national title HIA Australian Spec Home of the Year.

In 2021, two homes designed with Eden Brae Homes were awarded three Master Builders Excellence Awards including NSW Best Display Home Overall At the same event two more homes designed by Treble, this time with Buildcraft Constructions received the MBA Excellence Award in their category.

In 2022, two of Treble's designed homes, both built by Eden Brae Homes, were awarded one Hunter Region HIA Excellence Award and one NSW MBA Excellence Award in their categories.

References

Australian television presenters
Living people
Australian interior designers
1969 births